Alexander Bwalya Chikwanda (24 December 1938 - 3 May 2022) was a Zambian politician. He was a member of the National Assembly during the 1960s and again in the 2010s, also serving as Minister of Finance from 1973 to 1976 and again from October 2011 to September 2016.

Biography
He studied economics at Lund University in Sweden.

In the 1964 general elections he was elected to the Legislative Council in the Kitwe North constituency, but later gave up his seat so that it could be contested by Andrew Mutemba. He returned to the National Assembly as MP for Kalulushi in the 1973 elections.

In 2011 became a member of the National Assembly again after being nominated by President Michael Sata.

Personal life
He was an uncle of the former President Michael Sata.

References

1938 births
Living people
Finance Ministers of Zambia
Members of the National Assembly of Zambia
Patriotic Front (Zambia) politicians
Lund University alumni
Place of birth missing (living people)
Members of the Legislative Council of Northern Rhodesia